Meerapalli (Tamil:மீராபள்ளி), (French:Mirapalli) is the oldest standing mosque of Pondicherry. It was constructed during the first quarter of the 18th century.

History of Pondicherry Muslims
The renowned Arab navigator, Sulaiman Al Mahri, mentions the port of Bandikeri during the later part of 15th century or the first part of 16th century along the Coromandel coast, which is identified as Pondicherry in later days. A Muslim settlement was already there.

Structure
The mosque was originally built along the lines of the Indo-Islamic architecture. The Old structure has survived around which new extensions have been constructed.

References

Mosques in Puducherry